Sugar Hill is a 1974 American horror blaxploitation zombie film, directed by Paul Maslansky and starring Marki Bey as the title character who uses voodoo to get revenge on the people responsible for her boyfriend's death. It was released by American International Pictures. According to the film, the zombies are the preserved bodies of slaves brought to the United States from Guinea. AIP had previously combined the horror and blaxploitation genres with Blacula (1972) and its sequel Scream Blacula Scream (1973).

Plot
The story centers on Diana "Sugar" Hill (Bey), a photographer in Houston whose boyfriend, nightclub owner Langston (Larry D. Johnson), has been killed by mob boss Morgan (Robert Quarry) and his men when he refused to sell the club to Morgan. Sugar seeks the help of a former voodoo queen named Mama Maitresse (Zara Cully) to take revenge on Morgan and his thugs. Mama summons the voodoo lord of the dead, Baron Samedi (Don Pedro Colley), who enlists his army of zombies to destroy the men who killed Langston and now want the club. Investigating the killings is Sugar's former boyfriend, police Lt. Valentine (Richard Lawson).

Cast
 Marki Bey as Diana "Sugar" Hill
 Robert Quarry as Morgan
 Don Pedro Colley as Baron Samedi
 Betty Anne Rees as Celeste
 Richard Lawson as Valentine
 Zara Cully as "Mama" Maitresse
 Charles P. Robinson as "Fabulous"
 Larry D. Johnson as Langston
 Rick Hagood as "Tank" Watson
 Ed Geldart as O'Brien
 Albert J. Baker as George
 Raymond E. Simpson, III as King
 Thomas C. Carroll as Baker
 Big Walter Price as Preacher
 Charles Krohn as Captain Merrill
 J. Randall Bell as Dr. Parkhurst
 Peter Harrell, III as Police Photographer
 Judy Hanson as The Masseuse
 Gary W. Chason as Lab Technician
 Roy L. Downey as Stevedore
 Garrett Scales as Crew Chief
 John E. Scarborough as Uniformed Cop

Production
The film, budgeted at $350,000, was shot on location in Houston at such locations as the Heights branch of the Houston Public Library (a historical landmark), used in the film as a "Voodoo Institute". Sugar Hill was the last film Quarry did for AIP, after a run that included the Count Yorga films. Also appearing in the film was Cully, who played Mama Jefferson on the TV show The Jeffersons. Charles P. Robinson, known for his role as Mac Robinson on NBC's Night Court, portrayed the character of Fabulous. Hank Edds created the makeup effects for the zombies in the film.

Release
The film was released theatrically in the United States by American International Pictures in February 1974. It was cut to 83 minutes for television and retitled The Zombies of Sugar Hill.

The film was released on VHS by Orion Home Video in 1996., and on DVD in October 2011 as part of MGM's Limited Edition series.

Reception
Writing in The Zombie Movie Encyclopedia, academic Peter Dendle called it "a humorously dated blaxploitation feature" whose zombies "represent a throwback to the classic zombie conceptualization of the '30s and '40s".  Adam Tyner of DVD Talk rated it 4 out of 5 stars and wrote, "Creepy, sexy, sleazy, and a borderline-surreal amount of fun, Sugar Hill is a perfect movie for a Halloween marathon and probably my single favorite blaxploitation flick, period".

In popular culture
Rapper MF Doom sampled several audio clips from the film under his alias King Geedorah on the album Take Me to Your Leader (2003).

Trivia 

The film was broadcast on Tele 5 as part of the programme format SchleFaZ in season 2.

References

External links 

1974 films
1974 horror films
American zombie films
African-American films
Blaxploitation films
Films shot in Houston
Films set in Houston
American International Pictures films
Films about Voodoo
African-American horror films
Films directed by Paul Maslansky
1970s English-language films
1970s American films